This article briefly describes the components and systems found in jet engines.

Major components

Major components of a turbojet including references to turbofans, turboprops and turboshafts:

Cold section:
Air intake (inlet) — For subsonic aircraft, the inlet is a duct which is required to ensure smooth airflow into the engine despite air approaching the inlet from directions other than straight ahead. This occurs on the ground from cross winds and in flight with aircraft pitch and yaw motions. The duct length is minimised to reduce drag and weight. Air enters the compressor at about half the speed of sound so at flight speeds lower than this the flow will accelerate along the inlet and at higher flight speeds it will slow down. Thus the internal profile of the inlet has to accommodate both accelerating and diffusing flow without undue losses. For supersonic aircraft, the inlet has features such as cones and ramps to produce the most efficient series of shockwaves which form when supersonic flow slows down. The air slows down from the flight speed to subsonic velocity through the shockwaves, then to about half the speed of sound at the compressor through the subsonic part of the inlet. The particular system of shockwaves is chosen, with regard to many constraints such as cost and operational needs, to minimize losses which in turn maximizes the pressure recovery at the compressor.
Compressor  or fan — The compressor is made up of stages. Each stage consists of rotating blades and stationary stators or vanes. As the air moves through the compressor, its pressure and temperature increase. The power to drive the compressor comes from the  turbine  (see below), as shaft torque and speed.
Bypass ducts deliver the flow from the fan with minimum losses to the bypass propelling nozzle. Alternatively the fan flow may be mixed with the turbine exhaust before entering a single propelling nozzle. In another arrangement an afterburner may be installed between the mixer and nozzle.
Shaft — The shaft connects the turbine to the compressor, and runs most of the length of the engine. There may be as many as three concentric shafts, rotating at independent speeds, with as many sets of turbines and compressors. Cooling air for the turbines may flow through the shaft from the compressor.
Diffuser section: - The diffuser slows down the compressor delivery air to reduce flow losses in the combustor. Slower air is also required to help stabilize the combustion flame and the higher static pressure improves the combustion efficiency. 
Hot section:
Combustor or combustion chamber — Fuel is burned continuously after initially being ignited during the engine start.
Turbine — The turbine is a series of bladed discs that act like a windmill, extracting energy from the hot gases leaving the combustor. Some of this energy is used to drive the compressor. Turboprop, turboshaft and turbofan engines have additional turbine stages to drive a propeller, bypass fan or helicopter rotor. In a free turbine  the turbine driving the compressor rotates independently of that which powers the propeller or helicopter rotor. Cooling air, bled from the compressor, may be used to cool the turbine blades, vanes and discs to allow higher turbine entry gas temperatures for the same turbine material temperatures.** 
Afterburner or reheat (British) — (mainly military) Produces extra thrust by burning fuel in the jetpipe. This reheating of the turbine exhaust gas raises the propelling nozzle entry temperature and exhaust velocity. The nozzle area is increased to accommodate the higher specific volume of the exhaust gas. This maintains the same airflow through the engine to ensure no change in its operating characteristics.
Exhaust or nozzle — Turbine exhaust gases pass through the propelling nozzle to produce a high velocity jet. The nozzle is usually convergent with a fixed flow area.
Supersonic nozzle — For high nozzle pressure ratios (Nozzle Entry Pressure/Ambient Pressure) a convergent-divergent (de Laval) nozzle is used. The expansion to atmospheric pressure and supersonic gas velocity continues downstream of the throat and produces more thrust.

Components working together
The components above, except the shaft, are linked by a parameter common to all of them, the flow rate of gas passing through the engine which is the same for all components at the same time (as a basic statement this is an acceptable approximation which ignores the addition of fuel in the combustor and bleeding air from the compressor). There is a common requirement for all of them, to waste as little of the fuel supplied to the engine in collectively contributing to the output of the engine, which is thrust or power to a propeller or rotor. For flow through ducts this means keeping the flow Mach number (Mn) low since losses increase with increasing Mn. Having too high a Mn at entry to a duct is particularly relevant in ducts where there is heat addition, ie the engine combustor, and an afterburner if fitted, since the Mn would reach sonic velocity if the entry Mn were too high (Rayleigh flow).

The compressor and turbine, as well as having to pass the same flow, turn together so the speeds have a fixed relationship (usually equal unless connected with a gearbox), and one drives the other so the turbine power has to equal the compressor power. At the same time losses in the compressor and turbine have to be reduced so they operate with acceptable efficiency.

The designing, sizing and manipulation of the operating characteristics of the components so they work together as a unit is known as matching.

The performance and efficiency of an engine can never be taken in isolation; for example fuel/distance efficiency of a supersonic jet engine maximises at about Mach 2, whereas the drag for the vehicle carrying it is increasing as a square law and has much extra drag in the transonic region. The highest fuel efficiency for the overall vehicle is thus typically at Mach ~0.85.

For the engine optimisation for its intended use, important here is air intake design, overall size, number of compressor stages (sets of blades), fuel type, number of exhaust stages, metallurgy of components, amount of bypass air used, where the bypass air is introduced, and many other factors. For instance, consider design of the air intake.

Air intakes
The air intake (inlet U.S.) is an aerodynamic duct extending from an entry lip to the engine fan/compressor. For supersonic intakes with variable geometry it is called an intake system, referring to the need for shock-wave and internal duct flow management using variable position surfaces (ramps or cones) and bypass doors. The duct may be part of the fuselage structure with entry lip in various locations (aircraft nose - Corsair A-7, fuselage side - Dassault Mirage III), or located in an engine nacelle attached to the fuselage (Grumman F-14 Tomcat, Bombardier CRJ) or wing (Boeing 737).

Subsonic inlets

Pitot inlets are used for subsonic aircraft. A pitot inlet is little more than a tube with an aerodynamic fairing around it.

When an aircraft is not moving, and there is no wind, air approaches the intake from all directions: directly ahead, from the side, and from behind.

At low airspeeds, the streamtube approaching the lip is larger in cross-section than the lip flow area, whereas at the intake design flight Mach number the two flow areas are equal. At high flight speeds the streamtube is smaller, with excess air spilling round the lip.

Radiusing of the lip prevents flow separation and compressor inlet distortion at low speeds during crosswind operation and take-off rotation.

Supersonic inlets
Supersonic intakes exploit shock waves to decelerate the airflow to a subsonic condition at compressor entry.

There are basically two forms of shock waves:

 Normal shock waves lie perpendicular to the direction of the flow. Normal shock waves tend to cause a large drop in stagnation pressure. The higher the supersonic entry Mach number to a normal shock wave, the lower the subsonic exit Mach number and the stronger the shock (i.e. the greater the loss in stagnation pressure across the shock wave).
 Conical (3-dimensional) and oblique shock waves (2D) are angled rearwards, like the bow wave on a ship or boat, and radiate from a flow disturbance such as a cone or a ramp. For a given inlet Mach number, they are weaker than the equivalent normal shock wave and, although the flow slows down, it remains supersonic throughout. Conical and oblique shock waves turn the flow, which continues in the new direction, until another flow disturbance is encountered downstream. Note: Comments made regarding 3 dimensional conical shock waves, generally also apply to 2D oblique shock waves.

A sharp-lipped version of the pitot intake, described above for subsonic applications, performs quite well at moderate supersonic flight speeds. A detached normal shock wave forms just ahead of the intake lip and 'shocks' the flow down to a subsonic velocity. However, as flight speed increases, the shock wave becomes stronger, causing a larger percentage decrease in stagnation pressure (i.e. poorer pressure recovery). An early US supersonic fighter, the F-100 Super Sabre, used such an intake.

More advanced supersonic intakes, excluding pitots:

a) exploit a combination of conical shock wave/s and a normal shock wave to improve pressure recovery at high supersonic flight speeds. Conical shock wave/s are used to reduce the supersonic Mach number at entry to the normal shock wave, thereby reducing the resultant overall shock losses.

b) have a design shock-on-lip flight Mach number, where the conical/oblique shock wave/s intercept the cowl lip, thus enabling the streamtube capture area to equal the intake lip area. However, below the shock-on-lip flight Mach number, the shock wave angle/s are less oblique, causing the streamline approaching the lip to be deflected by the presence of the cone/ramp. Consequently, the intake capture area is less than the intake lip area, which reduces the intake airflow. Depending on the airflow characteristics of the engine, it may be desirable to lower the ramp angle or move the cone rearwards to refocus the shockwaves onto the cowl lip to maximise intake airflow.

c) are designed to have a normal shock in the ducting downstream of intake lip, so that the flow at compressor/fan entry is always subsonic. This intake is known as a mixed-compression inlet. However, two difficulties arise for these intakes: one occurs during engine throttling while the other occurs when the aircraft speed (or Mach) changes. 
If the engine is throttled back, there is a reduction in the corrected (or non-dimensional) airflow of the LP compressor/fan, but (at supersonic conditions) the corrected airflow at the intake lip remains constant, because it is determined by the flight Mach number and intake incidence/yaw. This discontinuity is overcome by the normal shock moving to a lower cross-sectional area in the ducting, to decrease the Mach number at entry to the shockwave. This weakens the shockwave, improving the overall intake pressure recovery. So, the absolute airflow stays constant, whilst the corrected airflow at compressor entry falls (because of a higher entry pressure). Excess intake airflow may also be dumped overboard or into the exhaust system, to prevent the conical/oblique shock waves being disturbed by the normal shock being forced too far forward by engine throttling.

The second difficulty occurs when the aircraft Mach number changes. The airflow has to be the same at the intake lip, at the throat and at the engine. This statement is a consequence the conservation of mass. However, the airflow is not generally the same when the aircraft's supersonic speed changes. This difficulty is known as the airflow matching problem which is solved by more complicated inlet designs than are typical of subsonic inlets. For example, to match airflow, a supersonic inlet throat can be made variable and some air can be bypassed around the engine and then pumped as secondary air by an ejector nozzle. If the inlet flow is not match, it may become unstable with the normal shock wave in the throat suddenly moving forward beyond the lip, known as inlet unstart. Spillage drag is high and pressure recovery low with only a plane shock wave in place of the normal set of oblique shock waves. In the SR-71 installation the engine would continue to run although afterburner blowout sometimes occurred.

Inlet cone

Many second generation supersonic fighter aircraft featured an inlet cone, which was used to form the conical shock wave. This type of inlet cone is clearly seen at the very front of the English Electric Lightning and MiG-21 aircraft, for example.

The same approach can be used for air intakes mounted at the side of the fuselage, where a half cone serves the same purpose with a semicircular air intake, as seen on the F-104 Starfighter and BAC TSR-2.

Some intakes are biconic; that is they feature two conical surfaces: the first cone is supplemented by a second, less oblique, conical surface, which generates an extra conical shockwave, radiating from the junction between the two cones. A biconic intake is usually more efficient than the equivalent conical intake, because the entry Mach number to the normal shock is reduced by the presence of the second conical shock wave.

The intake on the SR-71 had a translating conical spike which controlled the shock wave positions to give maximum pressure recovery.

Inlet ramp

For rectangular intakes the equivalent way to generate the required shock system, compared to circular intake conical bodies, is to use ramps. A ramp causes an abrupt airflow deviation in supersonic flow as does the presence of a conical surface.

Two vertical ramps were used in the F-4 Phantom intake, the first with a fixed wedge angle of 10 degrees and the second with a variable additional deflection above Mach 1.2. Horizontal ramps were used in the Concorde intakes.

Diverterless supersonic inlet

A diverterless supersonic inlet (DSI) consists of a "bump" and a forward-swept inlet cowl, which work together to divert boundary layer airflow away from the aircraft's engine while compressing the air to slow it down from supersonic speed. The DSI can be used to replace conventional methods of controlling supersonic and boundary layer airflow. DSI's can be used to replace the intake ramp and inlet cone, which are more complex, heavy and expensive.

Compressors

Axial compressors rely on spinning blades that have aerofoil sections, similar to aeroplane wings. As with aeroplane wings in some conditions the blades can stall. If this happens, the airflow around the stalled compressor can reverse direction violently. Each design of a compressor has an associated operating map of airflow versus rotational speed for characteristics peculiar to that type (see compressor map).

At a given throttle condition, the compressor operates somewhere along the steady state running line. Unfortunately, this operating line is displaced during transients. Many compressors are fitted with anti-stall systems in the form of bleed bands or variable geometry stators to decrease the likelihood of surge. Another method is to split the compressor into two or more units, operating on separate concentric shafts.

Another design consideration is the average stage loading. This can be kept at a sensible level either by increasing the number of compression stages (more weight/cost) or the mean blade speed (more blade/disc stress).

Although large flow compressors are usually all-axial, the rear stages on smaller units are too small to be robust. Consequently, these stages are often replaced by a single centrifugal unit. Very small flow compressors often employ two centrifugal compressors, connected in series. Although in isolation centrifugal compressors are capable of running at quite high pressure ratios (e.g. 10:1), impeller stress considerations limit the pressure ratio that can be employed in high overall pressure ratio engine cycles.

Increasing overall pressure ratio implies raising the high-pressure compressor exit temperature. This implies a higher high-pressure shaft speed, to maintain the datum blade tip Mach number on the rear compressor stage. Stress considerations, however, may limit the shaft speed increase, causing the original compressor to throttle-back aerodynamically to a lower pressure ratio than datum.

Combustors

The first part of the combustor is an increase in area (diffuser) to slow the air from the compressor because too high an entry velocity to a duct with heat addition (a combustor) would cause unacceptably high pressure losses. The velocity is still too high for a flame to be held in place so a sheltered combustion zone (known as the primary zone) has to be provided using a flame holder for example.
After the air required for combustion has entered the front of the can further air enters through many small holes in the walls of the can to provide wall-cooling with a film of cooler air to insulate the metal surfaces with a protective thermal barrier.

Since the turbine cannot withstand the stoichiometric temperatures (a mixture ratio of around 15:1) in the combustion zone, the compressor air remaining after supplying the primary zone  and wall-cooling film, and known as dilution air, is used to reduce the gas temperature at entry to the turbine to an acceptable level (an overall mixture ratio of between 45:1 and 130:1 is used).

Combustor configurations have included can, annular, and can-annular.

Rocket engines, being a non 'duct engine' have quite different combustor systems, and the mixture ratio is usually much closer to being stoichiometric in the main chamber. These engines generally lack flame holders and combustion occurs at much higher temperatures, there being no turbine downstream. However, liquid rocket engines frequently employ separate burners to power turbopumps, and these burners usually run far off stoichiometric so as to lower turbine temperatures in the pump.

Turbines

Because a turbine expands from high to low pressure, there is no such thing as turbine surge or stall. The turbine needs fewer stages than the compressor, mainly because the higher inlet temperature reduces the deltaT/T (and thereby the pressure ratio) of the expansion process. The blades have more curvature and the gas stream velocities are higher.

Designers must, however, prevent the turbine blades and vanes from melting in a very high temperature and stress environment. Consequently, bleed air extracted from the compression system is often used to cool the turbine blades/vanes internally. Other solutions are improved materials and/or special insulating coatings. The discs must be specially shaped to withstand the huge stresses imposed by the rotating blades. They take the form of impulse, reaction, or combination impulse-reaction shapes. Improved materials help to keep disc weight down.

Afterburners (reheat)

Afterburners increase thrust by burning extra fuel in the jetpipe behind the engine.

Nozzles

The propelling nozzle converts a gas turbine or gas generator into a jet engine. Power available in the gas turbine exhaust is converted into a high speed propelling jet by the nozzle.

Thrust reversers

These either consist of cups that swing across the end of the exhaust nozzle and deflect the jet thrust forwards (as in the DC-9), or they are two panels behind the cowling that slide backward and reverse only the fan thrust (the fan produces the majority of the thrust). Fan air redirection is performed by devices called "blocker doors" and "cascade vanes". This is the case on many large aircraft such as the 747, C-17, KC-10, etc. If you are on an aircraft and you hear the engines increasing in power after landing, it is usually because the thrust reversers are deployed. The engines are not actually spinning in reverse, as the term may lead you to believe. The reversers are used to slow the aircraft more quickly and reduce wear on the wheel brakes.

Cooling systems
All jet engines require high temperature gas for good efficiency, typically achieved by combusting hydrocarbon or hydrogen fuel. Combustion temperatures can be as high as 3500K (5841F) in rockets, far above the melting point of most materials, but normal airbreathing jet engines use rather lower temperatures.

Cooling systems are employed to keep the temperature of the solid parts below the failure temperature.

Air systems

Gas turbines have a secondary air system which is fundamental to the operation of the engine. It provides cooling air to the turbines, airflow into bearing cavities to prevent oil flowing out and cavity pressurization to ensure rotor thrust loads give acceptable thrust bearing life.

Air, bled from the compressor exit, passes around the combustor and is injected into the rim of the rotating turbine disc. The cooling air then passes through complex passages within the turbine blades. After removing heat from the blade material, the air (now fairly hot) is vented, via cooling holes, into the main gas stream. Cooling air for the turbine vanes undergoes a similar process.

Cooling the leading edge of the blade can be difficult, because the pressure of the cooling air just inside the cooling hole may not be much different from that of the oncoming gas stream. One solution is to incorporate a cover plate on the disc. This acts as a centrifugal compressor to pressurize the cooling air before it enters the blade. Another solution is to use an ultra-efficient turbine rim seal to pressurize the area where the cooling air passes across to the rotating disc.

Seals are used to prevent oil leakage, control air for cooling and prevent stray air flows into turbine cavities.

A series of (e.g. labyrinth) seals allow a small flow of bleed air to wash the turbine disc to extract heat and, at the same time, pressurize the turbine rim seal, to prevent hot gases entering the inner part of the engine.
Other types of seals are hydraulic, brush, carbon etc.

Small quantities of compressor bleed air are also used to cool the shaft, turbine shrouds, etc.
Some air is also used to keep the temperature of the combustion chamber walls below critical. This is done using primary and secondary airholes which allow a thin layer of air to cover the inner walls of the chamber preventing excessive heating.

Exit temperature is dependent on the turbine upper temperature limit depending on the material. Reducing the temperature will also prevent thermal fatigue and hence failure.
Accessories may also need their own cooling systems using air from the compressor or outside air.

Air from compressor stages is also used for heating of the fan, airframe anti-icing and for cabin heat. Which stage is bled from depends on the atmospheric conditions at that altitude.

Fuel system

Apart from providing fuel to the engine, the fuel system is also used to control propeller speeds, compressor airflow and cool lubrication oil. Fuel is usually introduced by an atomized spray, the amount of which is controlled automatically depending on the rate of airflow.

So the sequence of events for increasing thrust is, the throttle opens and fuel spray pressure is increased, increasing the amount of fuel being burned. This means that exhaust gases are hotter and so are ejected at higher acceleration, which means they exert higher forces and therefore increase the engine thrust directly. It also increases the energy extracted by the turbine which drives the compressor even faster and so there is an increase in air flowing into the engine as well.

Obviously, it is the rate of the mass of the airflow that matters since it is the change in momentum (mass x velocity) that produces the force. However, density varies with altitude and hence inflow of mass will also vary with altitude, temperature etc. which means that throttle values will vary according to all these parameters without changing them manually.

This is why fuel flow is controlled automatically. Usually there are 2 systems, one to control the pressure and the other to control the flow. The inputs are usually from pressure and temperature probes from the intake and at various points through the engine. Also throttle inputs, engine speed etc. are required. These affect the high pressure fuel pump.

Hydromechanical unit (HMU)

Engine thrust has to be maintained or varied at the will of the pilot by varying the fuel flow. But it has to be done without exceeding any limitations which could damage the engine or cause a flame-out (a combustible mixture has to be maintained in the combustion chambers to prevent lean or rich flame-out). Complex hydromechanical units were used to implement these requirements before electronic engine controls were developed.
 
The following explains some HMU functions for fuel control systems in the 1960's. The fuel flow depends on the area of a variable restriction in a fuel tube (a throttle valve which has its area adjusted by the pilot) and the pressure drop across it. The pressure drop has to be maintained by the HMU if the pilot's throttle valve is to control the fuel flow. The fuel must be reduced with altitude to maintain the same a/f ratio as the lower ambient pressure means less weight of air entering the engine (early engine controls used a Barostat or Barometric Pressure Control depending on the type of fuel pump, fixed or variable displacement). When the pilot wants more thrust the rate of increase in fuel flow that comes with moving the thrust lever (throttle) must not be too  great but at the same time must be enough to accelerate the engine quickly without stalling the compressor. When reducing thrust the rate at which the fuel decreases must not be too quick or a flame-out will occur. At high engine speeds over-speeding and over-temperaturing (going beyond the maximum allowable) must be prevented to avoid turbine blade damage. An example of an HMU, although called a Constant All Speed Control (CASC), was the Rolls-Royce/Lucas fuel control used on the Rolls-Royce Spey. It performed all the above functions as well as maintaining the HP shaft speed (being the basic control parameter) selected by the pilot for most subsequent flight conditions, the LP shaft speed was prevented from exceeding its aerodynamic speed (N/sqrtT) limit which occurs at low inlet temperatures, the maximum pressure in the engine, which occurred on cold days, to preserve the fatigue life of the casings.

The following describes a recent fuel control, that used on a CFM International CFM565B engine, installed on an Airbus A320, which has a FADEC controlling and computing all the functions previously done by an HMU. An HMU is still required because electrical actuators (torque motors or stepper motors) are needed to convert the digital signals from the FADEC into fuel flow changes. The HMU has to implement the following: the variable restriction (called the fuel metering valve FMV) and the pressure drop across it (by using a bypass valve between the high pressure fuel pump and the FMV). The pressure drop is kept constant so the fuel flow to the fuel nozzle only depends on the FMV position. The pilot's thrust lever request for fuel is only one request that goes into the FADEC to position the FMV. Others, such as the HP rotor speed, will modify the pilot's request as necessary before sending a signal to the torque motor which sets the position of the FMV. The HMU also sends fuel hydraulic signals using FADEC-controlled individual torque motors to actuators for the variable stator vanes, low and high pressure turbine clearance control, high pressure compressor clearance control and a motor for the variable bleed valves.

Propellant pump
Propellant pumps are usually present to raise the propellant pressure above the pressure in the combustion chamber so that the fuel can be injected. Fuel pumps are usually driven by the main shaft, via gearing.

Turbopumps

Turbopumps are centrifugal pumps which are spun by gas turbines and are used to raise the propellant pressure above the pressure in the combustion chamber so that it can be injected and burnt. Turbopumps are very commonly used with rockets, but ramjets and turbojets also have been known to use them. The drive gases for the turbopump is usually generated in separate chambers with off-stoichiometric combustion and the relatively small mass flow is dumped either through a special nozzle, or at a point in the main nozzle; both cause a small reduction in performance. In some cases (notably the Space Shuttle Main Engine) staged combustion is used, and the pump gas exhaust is returned into the main chamber where the combustion is completed and essentially no loss of performance due to pumping losses then occurs.

Ramjet turbopumps use ram air expanding through a turbine.

Engine starting system

The fuel system as explained above is one of the two systems required for starting the engine. The other is the actual ignition of the air/fuel mixture in the chamber. Usually, an auxiliary power unit is used to start the engines. It has a starter motor which has a high torque transmitted to the compressor unit. When the optimum speed is reached, i.e. the flow of gas through the turbine is sufficient, the turbines take over.

There are a number of different starting methods such as electric, hydraulic, pneumatic, etc.

The electric starter works with gears and clutch plate linking the motor and the engine. The clutch is used to disengage when optimum speed is achieved. This is usually done automatically. The electric supply is used to start the motor as well as for ignition. The voltage is usually built up slowly as starter gains speed.

Some military aircraft need to be started quicker than the electric method permits and hence they use other methods such as a cartridge turbine starter or "cart starter". This is an impulse turbine impacted by burning gases from a cartridge, usually created by igniting a solid propellant similar to gunpowder. It is geared to rotate the engine and also connected to an automatic disconnect system, or overrunning clutch. The cartridge is set alight electrically and used to turn the starter's turbine.

Another turbine starter system is almost exactly like a little engine. Again the turbine is connected to the engine via gears. However, the turbine is turned by burning gases - usually the fuel is isopropyl nitrate (or sometimes Hydrazine) stored in a tank and sprayed into a combustion chamber. Again, it is ignited with a spark plug. Everything is electrically controlled, such as speed, etc.

Most commercial aircraft and large military transport airplanes usually use what is called an auxiliary power unit (APU). It is normally a small gas turbine. Thus, one could say that using such an APU is using a small gas turbine to start a larger one. Low pressure, high volume air from the compressor section of the APU is bled off through a system of pipes to the engines where it is directed into the starting system. This bleed air is directed into a mechanism to start the engine turning and begin pulling in air. The starter is usually an air turbine type, similar to the cartridge starter, but uses the APU's bleed air instead of the burning gases of the propellant cartridge. Most cart starters can also use APU air to turn them. When the rotating speed of the engine is sufficient to pull in enough air to support combustion, fuel is introduced and ignited. Once the engine ignites and reaches idle speed, the bleed air and ignition systems are shut off.

The APUs on aircraft such as the Boeing 737 and Airbus A320 can be seen at the extreme rear of the aircraft. This is the typical location for an APU on most commercial airliners although some may be within the wing root (Boeing 727) or the aft fuselage (DC-9/MD80) as examples and some military transports carry their APUs in one of the main landing gear pods (C-141).

Some APUs are mounted on wheeled carts, so they can be towed and used on different aircraft. They are connected by a hose to the aircraft ducting, which includes a check valve to allow the APU air to flow into the aircraft, while not allowing the main engine's bleed air to exit through the duct.

The APUs also provide enough power to keep the cabin lights, pressure and other systems on while the engines are off. The valves used to control the airflow are usually electrically controlled. They automatically close at a pre-determined speed. As part of the starting sequence on some engines, fuel is combined with the supplied air and burned instead of using just air. This usually produces more power per unit weight.

Usually an APU is started by its own electric starter motor which is switched off at the proper speed automatically. When the main engine starts up and reaches the right conditions, this auxiliary unit is then switched off and disengages slowly.

Hydraulic pumps can also be used to start some engines through gears. The pumps are electrically controlled on the ground.

A variation of this is the APU installed in a Boeing F/A-18 Hornet; it is started by a hydraulic motor, which itself receives energy stored in an accumulator. This accumulator is recharged after the right engine is started and develops hydraulic pressure, or by a hand pump in the right hand main landing gear well.

Ignition

Usually there are two igniter plugs in different positions in the combustion system. A high voltage spark is used to ignite the gases. The voltage is stored up from a low voltage (usually 28 V DC) supply provided by the aircraft batteries. It builds up to the right value in the ignition exciters (similar to automotive ignition coils) and is then released as a high energy spark. Depending on various conditions, such as flying through heavy rainfall, the igniter continues to provide sparks to prevent combustion from failing if the flame inside goes out. Of course, in the event that the flame does go out, there must be provision to relight. There is a limit of altitude and air speed at which an engine can obtain a satisfactory relight.

For example, the General Electric F404-400 uses one igniter for the combustor and one for the afterburner; the ignition system for the A/B incorporates an ultraviolet flame sensor to de-activate the igniter after light-off on minimum fuel has been detected.

Most modern ignition systems provide enough energy (20–40 kV) to be a lethal hazard should a person be in contact with the electrical lead when the system is activated, so team communication is vital when working on these systems.

Lubrication system

A lubrication system serves to ensure lubrication of the bearings and gears and to maintain sufficiently cool temperatures, mostly by eliminating friction. The lubricant can also be utilized to cool other parts such as walls and other structural members directly via targeted oil flows. The lubrication system also transports wear particles from the insides of the engine and flushes them through a filter to keep the oil and oil wetted components clean.

The lubricant is isolated from the external parts of the engine through various sealing mechanisms, which also prevent dirt and other foreign objects from contaminating the oil and from reaching the bearings, gears, and other moving parts, and typically flows in a loop (is not intentionally consumed through engine usage). The lubricant must be able to flow easily at relatively low temperatures and not disintegrate or break down at very high temperatures.

Usually the lubrication system has subsystems that deal individually with the lubrication supply system of an engine, scavenging (oil return system), and a breather (venting excess air from internal compartments).

The pressure system components are typically include an oil tank and de-aerator, main oil pump, main oil filter/filter bypass valve, pressure regulating valve (PRV), oil cooler/by pass valve and tubing/jets.'' 
Usually the flow is from the tank to the pump inlet and PRV, pumped to main oil filter or its bypass valve and oil cooler, then through some more filters to jets in the bearings.

Using the PRV method of control, means that the pressure of the feed oil must be below a critical value (usually controlled by other valves which can leak out excess oil back to tank if it exceeds the critical value). The valve opens at a certain pressure and oil is kept moving at a constant rate into the bearing chamber.

If the engine power setting increases, the pressure within the bearing chamber also typically increases, which means the pressure difference between the lubricant feed and the chamber reduces which could reduce flow rate of oil when it is needed even more. As a result, some PRVs can adjust their spring force values using this pressure change in the bearing chamber proportionally to keep the lubricant flow constant.

Control system

Most jet engines are controlled digitally using Full Authority Digital Electronics Control systems, however some systems use mechanical devices.

References

Jet engines